Anna Fontcuberta i Morral (born 1975) is Spanish physicist and materials scientist. Her research focuses on nanotechnology applied in the production of solar cells. She is a full professor at École Polytechnique Fédérale de Lausanne (EPFL) and the head of the Laboratory of Semiconductor Materials.

Career 
Fontcuberta i Morral studied physics at University of Barcelona and received her Bacholar's degree in 1997. In the following year she gained a diploma (Diplôme d'Etudes Approfondis, D.E.A.) in material sciences from Université Sorbonne Paris Nord. As a graduate student she joined the group of Pere Roca i Cabarrocas at Ecole Polytechnique in Palaiseau, France, and graduated in 2001 with a PhD on polymorphous silicon. She then went to the California Institute of Technology to work as postdoctoral scholar with Harry A. Atwater.

In 2003, she became a permanent research fellow at French National Centre for Scientific Research at the École Polytechnique. From 2004 to 2005 she was visiting scientist at California Institute of Technology. During this time she co-founded the startup company Aonex Technologies specialized in layer in the production of multi-junction solar cells. Sponsored by a Marie Curie Excellence Grant she became team leader at the Walter Schottky Institute at the Technical University of Munich in 2005, where she also habilitated in physics in 2009. There, she started her independent research activities on arsenic-based nanowires. 

In 2008, she joined the Institute of Materials Science & Engineering at the School of Engineering of EPFL as an assistant professor. In 2014 and 2019, she was successively promoted to associate and full professor. She is the founder and head of the Laboratory of Semiconductor Materials. Since January 2021, she is the associate vice-president for Centers and Platforms at EPFL. She also served as the president of the EPFL WISH foundation between 2018 and 2020, a foundation whose goal is to support female students on campus to excel in their careers.

Research 
Fontcuberta i Morral works on the boundaries of physics, material science and engineering, and focuses on quantum science, renewable energy production and sustainable material design. Her research ventures aim at the synthesis and characterization of semiconductor nano-structures and in particular on nano-wires for the application in new nano-electronic and nano-photonic systems. She studies novel semiconductors based on compounds and alloys such as germanium, germanium-tin, zinc phosphide, III-Arsenic’ and III-Antimony

Distinctions 
In 2012, she received EPFL's Rodolphe and Renée Haenny Fondation Prize. In 2015, she was awarded the European Physical Society's Emmy Noether Distinction for "noteworthy women physicists".

She has received prestigious research grants from the European Research Council and the Swiss National Science Foundation.

Selected works

References

External links 
 
 Publication listed on ORCID
 Publication listed on Publons
 Website of the Laboratory of Semiconductor Materials

1975 births
Living people
University of Barcelona alumni
École Polytechnique alumni
Academic staff of the École Polytechnique Fédérale de Lausanne
Spanish women scientists
Spanish physicists